Vladan Stransky (born 12 February 1973) is an Australian ice hockey player who played for the Sydney Bears in the Australian Ice Hockey League between 2002 and 2010 and is a former member of the Australian national ice hockey team. Stransky has also played in the Czechoslovak First Ice Hockey League for HC Vitkovice, the Japan Ice Hockey League for the Nippon Paper Cranes, and in the 2. národní hokejová liga for HC Poruba.

Playing career
Stransky first played ice hockey in 1990 for HC Vitkovice of the Czechoslovak First Ice Hockey League. The following season he moved to Canada and joined the Dauphin Kings of the Manitoba Junior Hockey League for part of the 1992–93 before he moved to Japan and joined the Nippon Paper Cranes of the Japan Ice Hockey League. In 1999 Stransky joined HC Poruba of the 2. národní hokejová liga where he stayed for three seasons. Following the end of the end of the 2001–02 season Stransky moved to Australia and joined the Sydney Bears of the Australian Ice Hockey League (AIHL). During the 2008 season he scored the most assists in the AIHL with 41.

Stransky was first called up to represent Australia in 2009 where he joined the national senior team to compete in the 2009 IIHF World Championship Division I Group A tournament being held in Vilnius, Lithuania. Australia lost the tournament and were relegated to Division II for the following year. In 2011 Stransky was called up to represent Australia for the 2011 IIHF World Championship Division II Group A tournament being held in Melbourne, Australia. Australia won the tournament after winning all four of their games and finishing on top of the group standings.

Personal life
Stransky was born on 12 February 1973 in Czechoslovakia. He first started skating at the age of four.

In 2001 he moved to Australia where he met his wife, Nicole. In 2009 he became an Australian citizen while also retaining his Czech citizenship. Stransky currently lives in Mount Colah, New South Wales, Australia.

Career statistics

Regular season and playoffs

International

References

External links

1973 births
Australian ice hockey forwards
Czech ice hockey forwards
Czech emigrants to Australia
Czechoslovak ice hockey forwards
Dauphin Kings players
Living people
Nippon Paper Cranes players
Sydney Bears players
Czech expatriate ice hockey players in Canada
Czech expatriate sportspeople in Japan
Czech expatriate sportspeople in Australia
Expatriate ice hockey players in Australia
Expatriate ice hockey players in Japan
HC RT Torax Poruba players
HC Vítkovice players
Naturalised citizens of Australia